Anacrusis securiferana is a species of moth of the family Tortricidae. It is found in Brazil in the states of Paraná, Santa Catarina and São Paulo.

References

Moths described in 1866
Atteriini
Moths of South America